Andy Brown may refer to:

 Andy Brown (ice hockey) (born 1944), former ice hockey player in the National Hockey League and World Hockey Association
 Andy Brown (engineer), British Indy Racing League winning chief engineer
 Andy Brown (footballer, born 1915) (1915–1973), Scottish footballer for Torquay United
 Andy Brown (footballer, born 1963), English footballer for Tranmere Rovers
 Andy Brown (politician) (born 1972), politician from Austin, Texas
 Andy Brown (footballer, born 1976), Scottish footballer for Hull City
 Andy Brown (rugby league) (born 1981), rugby league footballer
 Andy Brown (singer), lead singer of Lawson

See also
 Andie Brown (born 1955), Anglican Archdeacon of Man (the Isle of Man)
 Andrew Brown (disambiguation)
 Andrew Browne (disambiguation)